The Forfarshire Cup is a football competition in Scotland competed for by teams in the Forfarshire Football Association from Angus, Dundee and Perth. The name of the competition is often baffling to some, as "Forfarshire" is an archaic and anglicised name for Angus which became official in the late 19th century around the time of Local Government (Scotland) Act 1889 which restructured and renamed many of Scotland's counties, however the name quickly fell into disuse and was very rarely used in everyday conversation and non existent today.

The Forfarshire Football Association was founded in 1883 and comprised eighteen clubs. Twelve from Dundee, two from Arbroath and one each from Broughty Ferry and Lochee (both independent of Dundee at the time), Coupar Angus and Montrose. The association immediately put up a trophy for competition between its member clubs. At that time, cup competitions were the only form of organised football in Scotland. In the early days of Scottish football the county cups were regarded as just as prestigious as the Scottish Cup, especially outwith the west of Scotland and the Central Belt whose teams were most successful in the Scottish Cup, with the result that they often attracted substantial crowds. Even in 1911, several special trains conveyed supporters of Arbroath to Dens Park for the final against Dundee Hibs and they contributed to a crowd of more than 7,000.

The competition has continued to be played every season as of 2006, although the Dundee clubs left in the 1980s. Dundee United asked the Forfarshire FA for permission to field their reserve team, as it had become virtually impossible for United to find suitable dates for their ties due to their regular participation in European competition. When this was refused the club withdrew from the competition and the FFA; shortly afterwards, Dundee followed suit. United re-entered the competition in the 2001–02 season, and the club now fields a mixture of first team and reserve/youth players. Even long before this Dundee played reserve teams in the early 20th century and withdrew from various seasons' competitions. Dundee withdrew completely for a few years in the early 1950s and also in the 1960s due to fixture congestion. From 2011–12 season, the competition was played as an under-19 tournament.

Dundee, to date, have won 28 trophies and as such are the most successful team in the competition's history.

Forfarshire FA remains an Affiliated Association of the Scottish Football Association.

List of winners
 Note that until October 1923 Dundee United were known as Dundee Hibernian
 Lochee United were a senior team not affiliated with their junior namesake
 1919–1920 competition was replayed after Dundee appealed against an ineligible player
 1927–1928 competition was discontinued at the semi final stage
 Stadium info- Rollo's Pier- home of Strathmore (Dundee). Strathmore later merged with Johnstone Wanderers to form Dundee Wanderers. East Dock Street- home of Dundee Harp.

References

External links
Complete record of all games at Scottish Football Historical Archive

Football in Dundee
Football in Angus, Scotland
1883 establishments in Scotland
Football cup competitions in Scotland
Football in Perth and Kinross